The Cágado (Turtle) is a river in the Brazilian state of Minas Gerais. It is a left bank tributary of the Rio Paraibuna and thus a sub-tributary of the Paraiba do Sul.

The river rises in the Serra da Mantiqueira in the town of Chácara and passes between Bicas and Juiz de Fora through to Pequeri, Guarará and Mar de Espanha to its mouth on the Rio Paraibuna between the cities of Santana do Deserto and Chiador.

Rivers of Minas Gerais